Åre may refer to:

 Åre, a locality in Sweden
 Åre Municipality in Sweden
 Åre ski resort in Sweden